The 52nd British Academy Film Awards, given by the British Academy of Film and Television Arts on 11 April 1999, honoured the best in film for 1998.

Shakespeare in Love won the award for Best Film (and previously won the Academy Award for Best Picture) and three other awards. Elizabeth was voted Outstanding British Film. Both Cate Blanchett and Judi Dench won awards for their portrayals of Queen Elizabeth I, while Geoffrey Rush won the award for Best Supporting Actor. Italian actor Roberto Benigni won the award for Best Actor in a Leading Role for his performance in Life Is Beautiful; he previously won the Academy Award for Best Actor. Peter Weir, director of The Truman Show, won for his direction.

The nominations were announced on 1 March 1999. Elizabethan films received an overall total of twenty-eight nominations, winning nine.

The ceremony took place at the Business Design Centre in Islington, London and was hosted by Jonathan Ross.

Winners and nominees

Statistics

See also
 71st Academy Awards
 24th César Awards
 4th Critics' Choice Awards
 51st Directors Guild of America Awards
 12th European Film Awards
 56th Golden Globe Awards
 10th Golden Laurel Awards
 19th Golden Raspberry Awards
 3rd Golden Satellite Awards
 13th Goya Awards
 14th Independent Spirit Awards
 4th Lumières Awards
 25th Saturn Awards
 5th Screen Actors Guild Awards
 51st Writers Guild of America Awards

References

External links
 Film in 1999 at BAFTA
 BAFTA Awards (1999) at IMDb
 And the Bafta winners are... at BBC News

Film052
British Academy Film Awards
British Academy Film Awards
British Academy Film Awards
British Academy Film Awards
1998 awards in the United Kingdom